Umarga (Omerga) Tehsil is a tehsil/ taluka/ subdistrict in  Osmanabad district, Maharashtra on the Deccan Plateau of India. The town of Umarga is the administrative headquarters of the tehsil.  There are 79 panchayat villages in Umarga Tehsil.

History

The Killari earthquake of 1993 affected most parts of the Umarga Tehsil. Approximately 2,500–3,000 lives were lost.
One of the hemadpanti mahavad temple along India.

Demographics
In the 2001 Indian census, Umarga Tehsil had a population of 241,339, with 123,852 (51.3%) males and 117,487 (48.7%) females, for a gender ratio of 949 females per thousand males. The tehsil was 80.4% rural in 2001.

In the 2011 census, Umarga Tehsil had 269,849 inhabitants and a gender ratio of 946 females per thousand males. The tehsil was 74.5% rural. The literacy rate in 2011 was 75.28% overall in Umarga Tehsil, with a rate of 84.73% for males and 65.35% for females. In 2011 in Umarga Tehsil, 11.7% of the population was 0 to 6 years of age.

According to 1951 census ,omerga tehsil has 60% Marathi, 26.25% Kannada and remaining other languages speakers.

Marathi is the most commonly used language in Omerga, with around 71% speaking Marathi as their primary language.Kannada is second most spoken language with around 18 %people speaking kannada.

Transportation
National Highways
Below National Highways passes through the Umarga Tehsil.

1. NH-65: Pune-Indapur-Solapur-Umarga-Hyderabad-Vijayawada-Machilipatnam(Andhra Pradesh)
(Villages from Umarga tehsil on this NH are- Yenegur-Dalimb-Yeli-Jakekur-Umarga-Turori)

2. NH-548B: Mantha-Selu-Pathari-Sonpeth-Parali-Ambajogai-Latur-Ausa-Umarga-Yenegur-Murum-Alur-Akkalkot-Nagansur-Vijayapura-Athani-Chikhodi-Sankeshwar-Gotur(Karnataka)

Towns and villages
There are two towns in Umarga Tehsil, Umarga and Murum, both of which have municipal councils. Among the villages in the tehsil are:

Monuments, temples and attractions

 One of the hamadepainti Mahadev temple among the maharashtra in Brahman Galli, Deshmukh wada Gunjoti, omerga.
 Shiv temple named "Jata Shankar" is located in Mulaj 10 km from Omerga.
 Shri Mathurapuri Maharaj is located in Babalasur (old). 
 Old historic Deshmukh wada at Brahman galli, Gunjoti Village Omegra
 Shri Premnath Maharaj is a temple and religious place in the village of Madaj (Mathmal). The god/saint Premnath Maharaj belongs to one of the sishyas (disciples) of Navnath. Premnath Maharaj took his Samadhi. Every year an annual yatra (religious fair) is held in the month of November. People come here in large number to take darshan during the yatra. 
 Old Madaj is an historic village which has contributed in various movements.
 The Shri Narayana Temple is located in Madaj. It is a Hemadpanthi temple with Barav.
 There are temples for Shiv and Ganesha in Shivaji Chowk.
 Holy places such as Amrutkund (the water of eternal life)
 Shri Ramligeshwar is a well-known temple and religious place in the village of Yeli.
 Sri Swaminarayan Mandir is located in Samudral. Also the Narsinh (Male lion God)Temple is there in this village. Every year an annual yatra (religious fair) is held in the month of May.-Vikram Dipankar.
 Shri Nath Mandir is the temple of Saint Eknath. Also has 2.5 Feet statue of Shri Vitthal. Every year there is a Festival called NATH-SHASHTHI, which includes Bhajan, Kirtan, Ann-daan.                    
In kaldeo Nimbala there is temple of shiva every year in April festival (yatra) After 12 days of gudi padwa which includes shobhi daaru, Tamasha, palkhi, Bhajan, Bharud, 10-15 thousands peoples Mahaprasad on Mahaarti-Subhash Manikrao kamble

References 

Osmanabad district
Talukas in Maharashtra